I'm in Love with You may refer to:

 I'm in Love with You (album) or the title song, by the Detroit Emeralds, 1973
 "I'm in Love with You" (Joy Williams song), 2005
 "I'm in Love with You" (Tony Moran song), 2018
 "I'm In Love With You", a song by Cliff Bennett and the Rebel Rousers, 1961
 "I'm In Love With You", a song by DeBarge from All This Love, 1982
 "I'm In Love With You", a song by Kasenetz-Katz Super Cirkus, 1969
 "I'm In Love With You", a song by Pat Boone, 1956
 "I'm In Love With You", a song by the Rubettes from Baby I Know, 1977
 "I'm In Love With You", a song by Smokie from Solid Ground, 1981